Below are the team rosters for the softball competition at the 2020 Summer Olympics. Each team consists of 15 players.

Rosters

Australia
The roster was released on 1 July 2021.

Canada
The Canadian roster of 15 athletes was named on 12 May 2021, including four members of the last team that competed at the Olympics (Lawrie, Rafter, Regula and Sailing).

Italy
The roster was released on 4 July 2021.

Japan
The roster was released on 23 March 2021.

Mexico
The women's national softball roster of Mexico was released on July 5, 2021.

United States
The United States roster was released on June 20, 2021.

References

R
Lists of competitors at the 2020 Summer Olympics
2020